View Petchkoson is a Thai Muay Thai fighter and amateur boxer.

Career
On April 3, 2018 Nongview defeated Chatchai P.K.Saenchaimuaythaigym by decision at the Lumpinee Stadium.

On August 7, 2018 View defeated Worawut BaoweeyGym by decision at the Lumpinee Stadium.

On October 2, 2018 View lost by decision to Messi Pangkongprab at the Lumpinee Stadium.

On April 9, 2019 View defetated Saknarinnoi Or.Unsuwan at the Lumpinee Stadium.

On June 29, 2019 View defeated Phet Sawansrangmunja by decision at the Lumpinee Stadium.

On July 30, 2019 View knocked out Pomphet Sitnumnoi in the second round at the Lumpinee Stadium.

On January 1, 2020 View challenged Klasuk Phetjinda for his Channel 7 Stadium 126 lbs title. He won the fight by decision.

On March 6, 2020 View faced Chalam Parunchai for the vacant Lumpinee Stadium 126 lbs title. He lost by decision

On September 13, 2020 View rematched Chalam Parunchai at the Channel 7 Stadium. He once again was defeated by decision. Following this loss View stopped training for 5 months due to covid restrictions and his studies in college.
He was invited by his promotor Chun Kiatpetch to join his camp for better training conditions.

For his first fight after joining the Kiatpetch training camp View defeated Dieselnoi Sor Damnoen by decision on March 21, 2021 at the Channel 7 Stadium.

View participated to the 2021 Thailand amateur boxing championship in August and won the gold medal in the Featherweight division. He joined the national training team with the ambition of qualifying for the 2024 Olympics. On September 28, 2021 View defeated Kompetch Sitsarawatsuer by decision at a Charity Event for Muay Thai in Chonburi.

View was scheduled to make the first defense of his Channel 7 Stadium 126 lbs title against Kompetch Sitsarawatsuer on May 22, 2022. He won the fight by decision. As of June 2022 he was the #1 ranked 126 lbs Muay Thai fighter in the world by the WMO.

Titles and accomplishments

Muay Thai
Channel 7 Stadium
 2020 Channel 7 Stadium 126 lbs Champion (one defense)
Siam Omnoi Stadium
 2016 Omnoi Stadium 115 lbs Champion
Professional Boxing Association of Thailand (PAT) 
 2017 Thailand 118 lbs Champion

Amateur boxing
 2x Thailand National Championship Featherweight  (2021, 2022)

Fight record

|- style="background:#fbb;"
| 2023-03-12 ||Loss ||align=left| Taito Gunji || K-1 World GP 2023: K'Festa 6 || Tokyo, Japan || Decision (Majority)|| 3 ||3:00 
|-
! style=background:white colspan=9 |
|-  style="background:#fbb;"
| 2022-11-13 || Loss ||align=left| Ronachai Tor.Ramintra || Amarin Super Fight, Rajadamnern Stadium || Bangkok, Thailand || Decision ||5 ||3:00

|-  style="background:#cfc"
| 2022-10-08 || Win ||align=left| Kompetch Sitsarawatsuer ||  TorNamThai TKO Kiatpetch + Muay Thai Kiatpetch, World Siam Stadium  || Bangkok, Thailand || Decision  || 5 || 3:00

|-  style="background:#fbb"
| 2022-08-13 || Loss||align=left| Kompetch Sitsarawatsuer || Ruamponkon Samui, Petchbuncha Stadium || Ko Samui, Thailand || Decision || 5 ||3:00

|-  style="background:#cfc"
| 2022-07-03|| Win ||align=left| Magnum Kiatchatchanan || Channel 7 Stadium || Bangkok, Thailand || Decision || 5 ||3:00

|-  style="background:#cfc"
| 2022-05-22|| Win ||align=left| Kompetch Sitsarawatsuer || Channel 7 Stadium || Bangkok, Thailand || Decision || 5 ||3:00 
|-
! style=background:white colspan=9 |

|-  style="background:#cfc;"
| 2021-09-28|| Win ||align=left| Kompetch Sitsarawatsuer || VAR Muay Charity Event for Muay Thai, Fonjangchonburi Stadium || Chonburi, Thailand || Decision  || 5||3:00

|-  style="background:#cfc"
| 2021-03-21|| Win ||align=left| Dieselnoi Sor Damnoen || Kiatpetch, Channel 7 Stadium || Bangkok, Thailand || Decision || 5 ||3:00

|-  style="background:#fbb;"
| 2020-09-13|| Loss ||align=left| Chalam Parunchai || Kiatpetch, Channel 7 Stadium || Bangkok, Thailand || Decision || 5 || 3:00

|-  style="background:#cfc;"
| 2020-07-26|| Win ||align=left| Kompatak SinbiMuayThai || Channel 7 Stadium || Bangkok, Thailand || Decision || 5 || 3:00

|-  style="background:#fbb;"
| 2020-03-06|| Loss ||align=left| Chalam Parunchai || Lumpinee Champion Kiatpetch, Lumpinee Stadium || Bangkok, Thailand || Decision || 5 || 3:00
|- 
! style=background:white colspan=9 |

|-  style="background:#cfc"
| 2020-01-26|| Win ||align=left| Klasuk Phetjinda || Channel 7 Stadium || Bangkok, Thailand || Decision (Unanimous)|| 5 ||3:00 
|-
! style=background:white colspan=9 |

|-  style="background:#cfc;"
| 2019-11-07 || Win ||align=left| Phetrung Sitnayokpaedriew ||  || Thailand|| Decision || 5 || 3:00

|-  style="background:#cfc;"
| 2019-10-08 || Win ||align=left| Kongsuk Sitsarawatsuer || Lumpinee Stadium || Bangkok, Thailand|| Decision || 5 || 3:00

|-  style="background:#cfc;"
| 2019-07-30 || Win ||align=left| Pomphet Sitnumnoi || Phat Phat + PK. Saenchai, Lumpinee Stadium || Bangkok, Thailand|| KO (Right hook)|| 2 ||

|-  style="background:#cfc;"
| 2019-06-29 || Win ||align=left| Phet Sawansrangmunja || PK. Saenchai, Lumpinee Stadium || Bangkok, Thailand|| Decision || 5 || 3:00

|-  style="background:#cfc"
| 2019-05-19|| Win ||align=left| Fahpenueng Por.Lakboon || Channel 7 Stadium || Bangkok, Thailand || Decision || 5 ||3:00

|-  style="background:#cfc;"
| 2019-04-09 || Win ||align=left| Saknarinnoi Or.Unsuwan || Kiatpetch, Lumpinee Stadium || Bangkok, Thailand|| Decision || 5 || 3:00

|-  style="background:#fbb;"
| 2019-02-12 || Loss ||align=left| Kongsuk Sitsarawatsuer || Lumpinee Stadium || Bangkok, Thailand|| Decision || 5 || 3:00

|-  style="background:#cfc;"
| 2019-01-06 || Win ||align=left| Khunsuknnoi Sitkaewpraphon || Kiatpetch, Jitmuangnon Stadium || Nonthaburi province, Thailand|| Decision || 5 || 3:00

|-  style="background:#fbb"
| 2018-11-09|| Loss ||align=left| Fahpenueng Por.Lakboon || Kiatpetch, Lumpinee Stadium || Bangkok, Thailand|| Decision || 5 || 3:00

|-  style="background:#fbb"
| 2018-10-02|| Loss ||align=left| Messi Pangkongprab || Kiatpetch, Lumpinee Stadium || Bangkok, Thailand|| Decision || 5 || 3:00

|-  style="background:#fbb"
| 2018-09-07 || Loss ||align=left| Worawut BaoweeyGym || Kiatpetch, Lumpinee Stadium || Bangkok, Thailand|| Decision || 5 || 3:00

|-  style="background:#cfc"
| 2018-08-07 || Win ||align=left| Worawut BaoweeyGym || Kiatpetch, Lumpinee Stadium || Bangkok, Thailand|| Decision || 5 || 3:00

|-  style="background:#cfc"
| 2018-07-10|| Win ||align=left| Messi Pangkongprab || P.K. Saenchai, Lumpinee Stadium || Bangkok, Thailand|| Decision || 5 || 3:00

|-  style="background:#cfc"
| 2018-04-03|| Win ||align=left| Chatchai P.K. Saenchaimuaythaigym || Kiatpetch, Lumpinee Stadium || Bangkok, Thailand|| Decision || 5 || 3:00

|-  style="background:#cfc"
| 2018-03-06|| Win ||align=left| Saknarinnoi Or.Unsuwan || Kiatpetch, Lumpinee Stadium || Bangkok, Thailand|| Decision || 5 || 3:00

|-  style="background:#cfc"
| 2018-01-23|| Win ||align=left| Pomphet Sor.Jor.Tongprachin ||  || Thailand|| Decision || 5 || 3:00

|-  style="background:#fbb;"
| 2017-12-08|| Loss ||align=left| Chailar Por.Lakboon || Lumpinee Champion Krikkrai, Lumpinee Stadium || Bangkok, Thailand || Decision || 5 || 3:00

|-  style="background:#cfc;"
| 2017-09-30|| Win ||align=left| Pomphet Sitnumnoi || Muay Thai Lumpinee Super Fight, Lumpinee Stadium || Bangkok, Thailand || Decision || 5 || 3:00

|-  style="background:#cfc;"
| 2017-08-29|| Win ||align=left| Pomphet Sitnumnoi || Petchnumnoi, Lumpinee Stadium || Bangkok, Thailand || Decision || 5 || 3:00

|-  style="background:#cfc;"
| 2017-07-18|| Win ||align=left| Watcharapon P.K. Saenchaimuaythaigym || Petchnumnoi, Lumpinee Stadium || Bangkok, Thailand || Decision || 5 || 3:00

|-  style="background:#fbb;"
| 2017-06-13|| Loss ||align=left| Saknarinnoi Or.Unsuwan || Eminentair, Lumpinee Stadium || Bangkok, Thailand || Decision || 5 || 3:00

|-  style="background:#fbb;"
| 2017-05-05|| Loss ||align=left| Pomphet Sitnumnoi || P.K.Saenchai, Lumpinee Stadium || Bangkok, Thailand || Decision || 5 || 3:00

|-  style="background:#cfc;"
| 2017-04-01|| Win ||align=left| Boonchana Nayokthasala ||  || Thailand || Decision || 5 || 3:00

|-  style="background:#cfc;"
| 2017-03-03|| Win ||align=left| Kangkawdaeng Huarongnamkeng || Phetkiatpetch, Lumpinee Stadium || Bangkok, Thailand || Decision || 5 || 3:00

|-  style="background:#cfc;"
| 2016-12-09|| Win ||align=left| Boonchana Nayokthasala || Lumpinee Krikkrai, Lumpinee Stadium || Bangkok, Thailand || Decision || 5 || 3:00

|-  style="background:#fbb;"
| 2016-09-25|| Loss ||align=left| Boonpha Wor.Wangprom || Channel 7 Stadium || Bangkok, Thailand || Decision || 5 || 3:00

|-  style="background:#fbb;"
| 2016-08-16|| Loss ||align=left| Boonpha Wor.Wangprom || Jitmuangnon, Rajadamnern Stadium || Bangkok, Thailand || Decision || 5 || 3:00

|-  style="background:#cfc;"
| 2016-07-02|| Win ||align=left| Kangkawdaeng Huarongnamkeng || Siam Omnoi Stadium || Samut Sakhon, Thailand || Decision || 5 || 3:00
|-
! style=background:white colspan=9 |

|-  style="background:#cfc;"
| 2016-05-28|| Win ||align=left| Numnoi Sitjemiao || Lumpinee Stadium || Bangkok, Thailand || Decision || 5 || 3:00

|-  style="background:#cfc;"
| 2016-05-03|| Win ||align=left| Tawanchai P.K. Saenchaimuaythaigym || Kiatpetch, Lumpinee Stadium || Bangkok, Thailand || Decision || 5 || 3:00

|-  style="background:#fbb;"
| 2016-03-29|| Loss ||align=left| Pomphet Sitnumnoi || Kiatpetch, Lumpinee Stadium || Bangkok, Thailand || Decision || 5 || 3:00

|-  style="background:#cfc;"
| 2016-03-05|| Win ||align=left| Numnoi Sitjemiao || Lumpinee Stadium || Bangkok, Thailand || Decision || 5 || 3:00

|-  style="background:#cfc;"
| 2016-01-24|| Win ||align=left| Pomphet Sitnumnoi || Phetkiatpetch, Lumpinee Stadium || Bangkok, Thailand || Decision || 5 || 3:00

|-
| colspan=9 | Legend:

References

View Petchkoson
Living people
1999 births
View Petchkoson